Enatimene lanceolatus is a species of sea snail, a marine gastropod mollusk in the family Muricidae, the murex snails or rock snails.

Description

Distribution
This marine species is endemic to Australia and occurs off Queensland.

References

 Houart, R., 2004. A review of the genus Enatimene Iredale, 1929 (Gastropoda: Muricidae) from Australia. Molluscan Research 24: 103-113

Enatimene
Gastropods described in 2004